Garad Abun Adashe (Harari: አቦኝ አደሼ) was a Harari Emir of the Adal Sultanate.

Reign 
Garad Abun Adashe ruled from 1519 to 1525 and led a campaign against the Walashma dynasty. Adashe campaigned against Sultan Abu Bakr ibn Muhammed; however he was decisively defeated at Harar his own base and Abu Bakr successfully invaded Harar with the assistance of Somali militias. Imam Ahmed Al Gurey served as an advisor and respected infantryman for Adashe against the Walashma forces. After his loss, Ahmed Gurey avenged his sultan's death and killed Abu Bakr. Garad Abun's son Garad Abass succeeded his father and supported Imam Ahmed in his conquest by leading Jihad after Ahmed's death.

See also 
Walashma dynasty
Garad

References 

1526 deaths
Year of birth unknown
Sultans
Sultans of the Adal Sultanate